15 Squadron SAAF is a squadron of the South African Air Force. It is currently a transport/utility helicopter squadron.

History 
The squadron was formed on 18 September 1939 as a SAAF Coastal Command squadron based at Cape Town. During the war it flew Junkers Ju-86, Bristol Blenheim and Martin Maryland aircraft. The squadron suffered a tragedy in May 1942, when eleven out of twelve personnel perished when three Blenheims encountered a sand storm and lost their bearings during a training flight and had to make an emergency landing in the desert.

The squadron flew Baltimore 5 Light Bombers in May 1945 as part of 253 Wing of the Mediterranean Allied Tactical Air Force. Other aircraft flown during and after the war included Bristol Blenheims, and Martin Baltimores. Notable Second World War members include Harry Schwarz, who in 1984 was made honorary colonel of the squadron.

Post Second World War
Aircraft flown after the war included the Aérospatiale SA 321 Super Frelon and the Aérospatiale SA 330 Puma.

The current base is AFB Durban situated at the old Durban International Airport. It operates Atlas Oryx and MBB/Kawasaki BK 117 helicopters. Their primary role is maritime and landward search and rescue. Two flights of Oryx, A and B Flights, are based in Durban and C Flight, consisting of four BK 117s is detached to AFS Port Elizabeth.

The current BK 117 aircraft of C Flight were originally inherited from the Apartheid-era "homelands", the Ciskei having acquired 3 in 1983, Venda 2 in 1985, Transkei 2 in 1986 and Bophuthatswana 2 in 1987, making a total of 10 with an extra delivered from Brazil. Two of the aircraft have already been mothballed at AFB Bloemspruit. Four remain in service with 15 Squadron. C Flight's conversion to Agusta A109LUH helicopters has been postponed due to delays in developing emergency flotation equipment for the type, thus precluding its use in a maritime environment.

Attrition

Roll of Honour
In respect of those recipients about whom it is available, the actions they were cited for follow below the table, since inclusion in the table itself is impractical.

Actions cited for

References

External links

Squadrons of the South African Air Force
Military units and formations established in 1939
Military units and formations in Durban
Military units and formations in Port Elizabeth
1939 establishments in South Africa